Villavaser is a parish (administrative division)  in Allande, a municipality within the province and autonomous community of Asturias, in northern Spain.

The population is 79 (INE 2011). The postal code is 33889.

Villages and hamlets
 Figueras
 Piniella
 Riovena
 Villavaser (Viḷḷabaser)

External links
 Allande 

Parishes in Allande
Populated places in Asturias